Ras-related protein Rab-7b is a protein that in humans is encoded by the RAB7B gene.

Function 

Rab7 is a small GTPase that plays a role in the transport and degradation of proteins in endosomes and lysosomes in mammalian cells. Rab7b, is localized to lysosome-associated compartments and is selectively expressed in monocytic cells. By promoting the degradation of toll-like receptor 4, RAB7B can negatively regulate the inflammatory activation of macrophages.

References

Further reading